White Sands may refer to:

White Sands, New Mexico, United States, residential area of the White Sands Missile Range
White Sands Missile Range, formerly the White Sands Proving Ground, a military installation in New Mexico hosting:
 White Sands Test Center, operated by the United States Army
 White Sands Test Facility, operated by NASA, and including:
 White Sands Space Harbor
White Sands National Park, desert of white sand dunes in New Mexico, US
Whitesands, a town in Vanuatu
White Sands Shopping Mall, Singapore, in Pasir Ris, Singapore
White Sands, Alberta, Canada, a summer village in Stettler County
White Sands (film), a 1992 Warner Bros. motion picture directed by Roger Donaldson
White Sands: Experiences from the Outside World
USS White Sands (ARD-20), a floating dry dock for the US Navy

See also
Whitesand (disambiguation)